Plaza Degetau, formally Plaza Federico Degetau, is the larger of two plazas at Plaza Las Delicias, the main city square in the city of Ponce, Puerto Rico. The other plaza is named Plaza Muñoz Rivera and is located north of Plaza Degetau. The square is notable for its fountains and for the various monuments it contains. The historic Parque de Bombas and Ponce Cathedral buildings are located bordering the north side of this plaza. The square is the center of the Ponce Historic Zone, and it is flanked by the historic Ponce City Hall to the south, the cathedral and historic firehouse to the north, the NRHP-listed Banco Crédito y Ahorro Ponceño and Banco de Ponce buildings to the east, and the Armstrong-Poventud Residence to the west. The square dates back to the early Spanish settlement in Ponce of 1670. It is the main tourist attraction of the city, receiving about a quarter of a million visitors per year.

History

According to the traditional Spanish colonial custom, a town's main square, or plaza, was the center of the town. In the case of Ponce, a Catholic church was built on the center of the plaza, thus splitting the plaza into two sections. Plaza Degetau (the subject of this article) is the southern of the two sections (see "Diagram of Plaza Las Delicias" herein), with the other plaza, Plaza Muñoz Rivera, located to the north of Plaza Federico Degetau. Plaza Degetau measures 6,400 square meters.

The history of Plaza Degetau dates back to as far as the creation of the first Catholic chapel in Ponce in 1670. It is also known that around 1840 Mayor Salvador de Vives planted trees as a renovation project for plaza. It was first lit in 1864. The plaza, as it stands today, was designed by architect Francisco Porrata-Doria in 1914.

In addition to the cathedral and the firehouse, Plaza Degetau at one point also contained an open dining Moorish-style kiosk that had been part of the 1882 Fair Exposition. The kiosk was still present at the time of the American invasion of the island in 1898 as reported by American photo-journalist William Dinwiddie, but it was demolished in 1914.

Name

Plaza Degetau was originally called Antigua Plaza Real (Old Royal Plaza), and later, Plaza Mayor (Main Plaza). In the early 20th century its name was officially changed to Plaza Federico Degetau, in honor of Federico Degetau, the first Resident Commissioner of Puerto Rico to the United States House of Representatives.

Features

Plaza Degetau is perhaps the best known of the two plazas and the one most often seen in pictures.

Fuente de los Leones
In the center of this plaza lies the famous Fuente de los Leones (Lions Fountain). The large, round-shaped fountain is bounded by a low, marble and granite wall. The fountain's wall boundary is shaped in the form of a regular octagon and built so that one of the vertices of the octagon points towards the historic Ponce City Hall. The fountain also features four lion statues and water that flows under colored lighting effects. The four lion statues are located one statue on each alternating vertex of the fountain's octagonal boundary wall.

In 1878 the spot now occupied by Fuente de los Leones was occupied by a monument to the Spanish Constitution of 1812. It had been erected under the direction of 1812 mayor of Ponce Jose Ortiz de la Renta, ca. 1820, but was removed in the 1870s by Carlist mayor and Spanish military officer Elicio Berriz. In 1882, the location was then occupied by "Arab kiosk" (a.k.a., "Kiosko La Alhambra") built in 1882 for the 1882 Ponce Fair. The kiosk was demolished in 1914. The current (2022) fountain was purchased in 1939 at the New York World's Fair. When originally installed, it was adorned with baby angel sculptures, but in the early 1940s the baby angels were replaced with the current (2022) lions. The lions were sculptured in 1940 by Victor Cott, a sculptor from Juana Diaz, during the mayoral administration of mayor Andrés Grillasca Salas. The fountain, including a mechanical basement, was remodeled and restored in 1993. Its base was enlarged and a computerized lighting system was installed.

The fountain was the inspiration for a poem published in 2002, that reads,
{| border=0
|-
| valign=top |
Spanish
Este fuenta fantastica es un sueño,
Que una noche romantica de orgia
Tejieron el amor y la poesia,
Con las ansias divinas del ensueño.

En multiples colores el diseño
Hace verter el agua en pedreria.
Y es como una sutil policromia,
Aquel paisaje esplendido y risueño.

El agua brota en chorros incesantes,
Mientras arriba el cielo resplandece,
Alfombrado de estrellas rutilantes.

Y es ya tanta su fuerza sugestiva,
Que el alma al contemplarla se estremece
Con un arrobamiento que cautiva.
Jose Ortiz Lecodet
| valign=top |
English
This fantastic fountain is a dream,
That a wildly romantic night
Knitted love and poetry,
With the divine cravings of daydream.

In multiplicity of colors the design,
Makes water be poured into rhinestones.
And it is like a subtle polychromy,
That splendid and smiling landscape.

The water spouts in endless jets,
While the sky above glows,
Covered with sparkling stars.

And its suggestive force is so strong,
That the soul shakes when contemplating it
With a trance that captivates. 
Jose Ortiz Lecodet|}

Juan Morel Campos

This plaza also features a statue of native composer Juan Morel Campos. This statue was produced at the workshop of Italian sculptor Luiggi Tomassi.

Other features
Also in this plaza is an obelisk in honor of the firefighters who fought the "El Polvorín" fire (see Parque de Bombas). The obelisk was unveiled in 1948, in time for the 50th anniversary of the frightful fire.

In the northwest side of the plaza and facing northwest, there is also a statue, called Blind Justice, of a woman in a long dress with her eyes covered by a cloth wrapped around the top of her head. The woman's left hand holds a sword that sits inside a shaft which rests on the ground, and there are two children sitting happily by her feet: one is embracing the lower part of the sword's shaft and the other child is playing with an orange tree branch. Blind Justice sits on the northwest area of the plaza and faces northwest.

A second statue, Maternity, sits on the plaza as well. This one consists of a woman sitting down and sitting two small children on her lap, one child sits on her left leg and the other one on her right leg, while the children lean against her chest. Maternity sits on the southwest side of the plaza and faces southwest. These two statues were designed by Victor Cott, a sculptor from Juana Diaz who also designed the four lions at Fuente de los Leones, Esclavo libertado and La Labradora.La Labradora is a third statue that used to be located on Plaza Degetau, on the southeast section of the plaza, facing southeast, but today (2018) adorns Parque Graciela Rivera. La Labradora, together with a fourth sculpture yet called El Cuerno de la Abundancia'' (The Horn of Abundance), were moved out of the plaza in the late 1940s to make room for the Monumento a los heroes de El Polvorín (1948) and the statue of Juan Morel Campos (~1950), respectively. El Cuerno de la Abundancia was located on the northeast section of the plaza and faced northeast but, in the late 1940s, was relocated to elsewhere in the city of Ponce; unfortunately, it was vandalized at the new location and was lost. The placing of the statues as well as the relocation of the last two statues, occurred during the 16-year mayoral administration of Andrés Grillasca Salas in the 1940s-1950s.

Setting
Plaza Degetau is bounded on the north by the Our Lady of Guadalupe Cathedral and the historic Parque de Bombas firehouse, on the south by Plaza Degetau street (also called Villa street and Comercio street), on the west by Union street, and on the east by Marina street. It is surrounded by two hotels, the Ponce City Hall, two historic banks (Banco de Ponce and Banco Crédito), a long-standing ice cream parlor called "King's Ice Cream", and various boutiques and cafes.

The plaza has wide mosaic-tile sidewalks, well-manicured flower gardens, well-trimmed bushes and Indian laurel trees, late 1800s lamposts, and numerous marble benches. It is home to the Lions Fountain, "one of the most beautiful fountains in Puerto Rico." The fountain is made of marble and bronze. During the day, the plaza hustles with schoolchildren, shoppers, and tourists. After the sun sets, there are oftentimes live bands giving concerts to "multigenerational families."

Gallery

Notes

References

External links

 Plaza Las Delicias video - featuring the Lions Fountain
 Information about Ponce's touristic places
 Photo of Plaza Degetau in the early 1900s, showing the statue of Blind Justice. Retrieved 28 July 2013.
 Photo of Plaza Degetau in 1910, then called "Plaza Principal", with Kiosko Arabe on the right, looking WNW Accessed 12 July 2020.
 Photo dated 1915 showing the precursor water fountain to the Lions Fountain at Plaza Degetau
 Photo of the fountain prior to the Lions Fountain, looking NW Accessed 15 December 2010.
 Photo of Plaza Degetau in the 1940s with Blind Justice Statue pictured. Retrieved 5 January 2011.
 Photo of Arab kiosk at Plaza Degetau. Retrieved 8 January 2011.

Buildings and structures in Ponce, Puerto Rico
Urban public parks
Parks in Ponce, Puerto Rico
Gardens in Puerto Rico
1670 establishments in Puerto Rico
Squares in Puerto Rico
Tourist attractions in Ponce, Puerto Rico